Dressor is an unincorporated community in Ramsey Township, Fayette County, Illinois, United States.

History
A post office was established at Dressor in 1888, and remained in operation until 1942. Nathaniel Dressor, the original owner of the town site, gave the community his name.

References

Unincorporated communities in Fayette County, Illinois
Unincorporated communities in Illinois